Melanoplus scudderi, or Scudder's short-wing grasshopper, is a species of spur-throated grasshopper in the family Acrididae. It is found in North America.

Subspecies
These three subspecies belong to the species Melanoplus scudderi:
 Melanoplus scudderi latus Morse, 1906 i
 Melanoplus scudderi scudderi (Uhler, 1864) i
 Melanoplus scudderi texensis Hart, 1906 i
Data sources: i = ITIS, c = Catalogue of Life, g = GBIF, b = Bugguide.net

References

Melanoplinae
Articles created by Qbugbot
Insects described in 1864